Return to the Batcave: The Misadventures of Adam and Burt is a 2003 American made-for-television biographical action-comedy film based on the 1966–1968 Batman television series which features the original stars Adam West and Burt Ward as themselves, with Jack Brewer and Jason Marsden portraying the young West (Batman) and Ward (Robin) in flashbacks. It was broadcast on CBS on March 9, 2003.

Plot 
Adam West prepares to attend a gala-style charity event targeted towards orphans, featuring a variety of classic cars, including the original Batmobile from Batman. Adam's butler, Jerry (whom Adam refers to as "Alfred"), arranges the event and reunites Adam with his former co-star, Burt Ward.

While at the gala, Adam reveals to Burt that he had kept the key to the original Batmobile from during the show's original run. As he showcases the key, the lights mysteriously go out, and when they turn back on, both Adam's key and the Batmobile itself are gone. After asking a valet, Adam discovers the thief had been asking for directions toward Arizona. Though Burt is reluctant to follow the perpetrators, Adam manages to coerce him into going on a road-trip in pursuit of the Batmobile.

As the duo travel down the Arizona roads, Adam and Burt reminisce on their life before the show. Burt recalls a time in which he was homeless, living under the Miami pier and collecting bottles for a living, before he managed to catch his big break after a successful audition as Robin. Adam, on the other hand, remembers how he had to compete against Lyle Waggoner for the role of Batman, only narrowly acquiring the part after the studio executives agreed he had a better jawline.

Arriving in Arizona, Adam and Burt stop into a nearby bar to ask about the mysterious Batmobile thief. As Burt steps away to urinate, Adam finds himself momentarily seduced by a mysterious woman, only for her to vanish moments later and a bar-fight to erupt. Defeating their attackers, Adam recalls the sexual tension between him and Julie Newmar, before noticing a frame of the original Batcave frozen onto the bar's television set. Leaving the bar, the duo find their car towed, but instead of a traffic ticket, they instead receive movie tickets to a screening of Batman: the Movie.

Adam and Burt notice during the film that all footage of Batman and Robin have been cut, instead featuring only the villains. During the screening, Burt recalls an incident in which television censors began to criticize the tightness of his Robin briefs, forcing him to take temporary shrinkage pills (implied to be hormone therapy) to decrease his genital size during shooting. At the same time, Adam deals with the painful memories of his divorce and ostracization from his children.

After the screening, the duo follow an oil slick to a nearby diner, but find no leads. After Burt and Adam recall a temporary on-set rivalry between them, a crazed fan who nearly killed Burt after a one-night stand, and a ridiculous outburst from method actor Vincent Price during his time as Egghead, a Batman fan that Adam had signed the breasts of years earlier (with a permanent marker that, fittingly, never washed off) arrives to tell them the location of the Batmobile.

Upon arrival to the Batmobile, the duo enter, but find it booby-trapped. Sedated and piloted remotely to the original Batcave set, Jerry reveals himself to be the thief and, in an odd turn of events, pulls off his mask to reveal himself to be Frank Gorshin, the actor who played the Riddler. Frank restrains Adam and Burt and reveals that, years earlier, he had stolen the set blueprints of the Batman series in his plan for revenge against the hero actors getting more recognition than those who played the villains. Adam realizes the woman from earlier was none other than Julie Newmar, who then reveals herself to be working as Frank's accomplice.

Strapped to an armed bomb, Adam tricks Frank into ejecting himself from the Batmobile and onto a ledge, before cutting his and Burt's restraints off with a prop Batarang he was gifted years earlier. Now free, the duo escape the cave just before it detonates (although Burt does suffer some burns), before calling the police to arrest Frank Gorshin and Julie Newmar.

Days later, Burt and Adam attend the re-opening of the classic car event for orphans. The lights vanish once more and the Batmobile is gone. Adam rushes off to find the perpetrators whilst accompanied by the classic Batman theme, with a more enthusiastic Burt running by his side.

Casting 
Apart from West and Ward, a number of actors from the original series also appeared in the film. This includes Frank Gorshin, who played the Riddler, Julie Newmar, who played Catwoman for the first two seasons of the show and Lee Meriwether, who played Catwoman in the Batman theatrical film. Gorshin and Newmar appear as themselves, while Meriwether appears as a waitress.

Due to licensing problems involving the original TV series, the makers of this film were only allowed to use footage from the 1966 Batman feature film. As a result, Lee Meriwether's rendition of Catwoman is the only one seen in archive footage in this film (even during a musical sequence intended to pay tribute to Newmar). Zambia-born actress Julia Rose plays the young Julie Newmar and gets to briefly don the Catwoman costume.

Jason Marsden, who plays the young Burt Ward/Robin, has done a few voice roles in DC/Warner Bros Cartoons such as Batman Beyond, Justice League Unlimited, and Young Justice.

Lyle Waggoner, who originally auditioned for the part of Batman, and Betty White both have cameos in the movie. Some of Waggoner's actual audition tape footage can be seen in the film. Waggoner ended up landing a role in another DC Comics' TV series: he played Steve Trevor on Wonder Woman in the 1970s alongside Lynda Carter as the title character. Adam West's daughter, Nina West, also has a cameo as a psychotic actress who tries to kill Burt Ward after a one-night stand. This incident is mentioned in Ward's autobiography, My Life in Tights. During the original series, of the four main supervillains (Joker, Riddler, Penguin, and Catwoman), only Riddler never entered the Batcave set; in the movie the Riddler finally does enter the Batcave.

Cast
 Adam West as himself
 Burt Ward as himself
 Jack Brewer as Adam West / Batman
 Jason Marsden as Burt Ward / Robin
 Lyle Waggoner as himself / narrator
 Frank Gorshin as himself
 Julie Newmar as herself / Arizona Bar Owner
 Lee Meriwether as Waitress in Diner
 Betty White as Woman in Window during Batclimb Sequence
 Amy Acker as Bonnie Lindsey 
 Brett Rickaby as Frank Gorshin / Riddler
 Curtis Armstrong as Jerry the Butler 
 Jim Jansen as William Dozier
 Stacy Kamano as Nghara Frisbie-West
 Ray Buktenica as Robert Butler
 Steve Vinovich as Bartender (was a bad guy)
 Andy Umberger as Sam Strangis (assistant director)
 Joel Swetow as Casting Director
 Nina West as Burt's One Night Stand
 Darla Haun as Charity Event Host
 Julia Rose as Julie Newmar / Catwoman
 Erin Carufel as Yvonne Craig / Batgirl
 Nikki Ziering as Lucy
 Quinn K. Redeker as Vincent Price / Egghead
 Tony Tanner as Burgess Meredith / Penguin
 Bud Weston as Cesar Romero / Joker
 Christopher Darga as Adam West's Agent Lou
 Ivar Brogger  as Doctor
 Silas Cooper as Wardrobe Man
 Todd Merrill as Network Executive
 John E. Goetz as Valet parker
 Elisa Marchhand as Fem fatale
 Rory Thost as Hunter
 Talt Ruppert as Publicist
 Ben Perkins as Fan boy
 Kelli King as Joneli
 Heidi Androl as Sexy fan
 Traci L. Crouch as Secretary 
 Frank Addela as Robin stuntman
 Steve Bialock as Batman stuntman
 Bobby Porter as Henchman – Big Joe
 Scott L. Schwartz as Henchman – Curly
 Carl Ciarfalio as Henchman – Slim
 Anthony G. Schmidt as Henchman – Pretty Boy
 Brian Shakti as Delivery boy
 Zack Milan as Mysterious Stranger (uncredited)
 Chris Dawson as Reporter (uncredited)
 Bryan Hanna as Director / Cameraman (uncredited)
 Paul A. Kaufman as Network Executive #2 (uncredited)
 Cesar Romero as The Joker (uncredited / archive footage from the 1966 film)
 Burgess Meredith as Penguin (uncredited / archive footage from the 1966 film)

Home media
Return to the Batcave was released on DVD on May 17, 2005, by Anchor Bay Entertainment.

References

External links 
 
 Some more information and trivia
 Return To The Batcave: The Misadventures of Adam and Burt @ BYTB: Batman Yesterday, Today and Beyond

2003 television films
2003 films
2000s action comedy films
2000s biographical films
American action comedy films
Television series reunion films
Batman films
Batman (TV series)
CBS network films
Films based on television series
Artisan Entertainment films
Television shows based on DC Comics
Films directed by Paul A. Kaufman
2000s American films